Marivana Viscuso is an Italian singer, songwriter and composer who lives in the U.S. state of Florida. Her song "Anuncio Classificado" was on Latin American Top 10 charts in 1993. Her brother is Emanuele Viscuso, a sculptor who was based in Miami Beach in the early 2000s.

In 2006, she was involved with a proposed charter school in Miami Beach, which planned to lease a building she owned that once housed an art gallery known as The Art Temple.

In 2007, she released, with the composer Louis Siciliano, the soundtrack for the Italian film Il Rabdomante directed by Fabrizio Cattani; she sings the song "Ya te olvidè". Now released new albums 'Seeds of Joy' and 'The voice of your emotions'.

In February 2016 released a new album Simply Marivana in digital download and in November she sing Dio come ti amo, a tribute to Domenico Modugno, in a compilation called L'anniversario del ragazzo del sud edited in Italy.

Albums

Singles

References

External links 
 
 

20th-century births
Year of birth missing (living people)
Living people
Italian women singers
Italian emigrants to the United States